WOW Hits 2004 is a two-disc compilation album of songs that have been dubbed to showcase the best in contemporary Christian music. It was released on October 7, 2003. The album features songs by Michael W. Smith, Newsboys, Amy Grant, Sixpence None the Richer, and many more widely renowned groups and singers. It peaked at No. 51 on the Billboard 200. The album was certified as platinum in the US in 2004 by the Recording Industry Association of America (RIAA).

Track listing

Disc one (Green Disc)
"He Reigns" – Newsboys
"Spoken For" – MercyMe
"Simple Things" – Amy Grant
"All About Love" – Steven Curtis Chapman
"Great Light of the World" – Bebo Norman
"Lord Have Mercy" (Live) – Michael W. Smith
"Day By Day" – Point of Grace
"You Found Me" – FFH
"Everything to Me" – Avalon
"Legacy" – Nichole Nordeman
"You're My God" – Jaci Velasquez
"Sing Alleluia" – Jennifer Knapp & Mac Powell
"Only Hope" – Caedmon's Call
"You Are a Child of Mine" – Mark Schultz
"The Other Side of the Radio" – Chris Rice
"My Heart Goes Out" – Warren Barfield **
"Masquerade" – Across the Sky **

Disc two (Yellow Disc)
"Nothing Compares" (live) – Third Day
"You Get Me" – ZOEgirl
"Getting Into You" – Relient K
"Stuck" – Stacie Orrico
"Phenomenon" – tobyMac
"Breathe Your Name" – Sixpence None the Richer
"The Valley Song (Sing of Your Mercy)" – Jars of Clay
"I Thank You" – Rebecca St. James
"Love, Peace & Happiness" – Out of Eden
"The Way I Feel" – 12 Stones
"I Still Believe" – Jeremy Camp
"Run" – Kutless
"Why Do I Do" – Jump5
"Pierced" – Audio Adrenaline
"By Surprise" – Joy Williams
"All My People" – Lil iROCC Williams **

** Denotes Bonus Track

Charts

Weekly charts

Year-end charts

See also
 WOW Hits

References

 Review at Amazon.com.  Retrieved on March 21, 2007.

2003 compilation albums
WOW series albums
WOW Hits albums